Gevensleben is a municipality in the district of Helmstedt, in Lower Saxony, Germany. The Municipality Gevensleben includes the villages of Gevensleben and Watenstedt.

References

Helmstedt (district)